The 2013 Seguros Bolívar Open Cali was a professional tennis tournament played on clay courts. It was the sixth edition of the tournament which was part of the 2013 ATP Challenger Tour. It took place in Cali, Colombia between 9 and 15 September 2013.

Singles main draw entrants

Seeds

 1 Rankings are as of August 26, 2013.

Other entrants
The following players received wildcards into the singles main draw:
  Giovanni Lapentti
  Alvaro Ochoa
  Eduardo Struvay
  Carlos Salamanca

The following players received entry from the qualifying draw:
  Juan Ignacio Londero
  Duilio Beretta
  Sebastian Exequiel Pini
  Fernando Romboli

Champions

Singles

 Facundo Bagnis def.  Facundo Argüello 6–2, 4–6, 6–3

Doubles

  Guido Andreozzi /  Eduardo Schwank def.  Carlos Salamanca /  João Souza 6–2, 6–4

External links
Official Website

Seguros Bolivar Open Cali
Seguros Bolívar Open Cali
2013 in Colombian tennis